Holly Walker is an American comedian, actress, and writer known for her role as a correspondent and staff writer on The Nightly Show with Larry Wilmore. Prior to working on The Nightly Show, she toured with The Second City comedy group, performing in Los Angeles, Chicago, and Las Vegas.

Walker got her first taste of performing when she was eight years old and was cast in a production called "For Spring is the Season of Happiness," playing Mother Nature. As an adult, she performed with Boom Chicago in Amsterdam and The Second City across the United States.

Filmography

References

African-American female comedians
21st-century American comedians
American women comedians
Living people
1967 births
21st-century American women
21st-century African-American women
21st-century African-American people
20th-century African-American people
20th-century African-American women